John Steele House may refer to:

John Steele House (Stoneham, Massachusetts), listed on the National Register of Historic Places in Middlesex County, Massachusetts
John Steele House (Salisbury, North Carolina), listed on the National Register of Historic Places in Rowan County, North Carolina
John Steele House (Toquerville, Utah), listed on the National Register of Historic Places in Washington County, Utah

See also
Steele House (disambiguation)